Food Rite (also Foodrite, Food Rite Grocery, and Food Rite Group) is an American supermarket chain operating nine stores in West Tennessee. The chain is owned by Joey Hayes and supplied by Associated Wholesale Grocers out of Southaven, Mississippi. The stores sell both groceries and various household products.

Locations
Locations in Tennessee include:
Dyer
Kenton
Newbern
Tiptonville
Trenton
Alamo
Bells

Other Locations

There are also other stores signed "Food Rite" in the area that are under separate management.
They may or may not have at one time been part of the same company:
Taylor's Food Rite in Saulsbury (formerly Yopp's)
Neifeh's Market in Covington
Collierville Food Rite in Collierville (now defunct)
In addition, there are various other stores located throughout the country with the same name.
Hebron Food Rite in Hebron, MD
Hurlock Food Rite in Hurlock, MD
Snow Hill Food Rite in Snow Hill, MD
Calhoun's Food Rite in Poplar Bluff, MO
Portageville Food Rite in Portageville, MO
Foodrite in Wappapello, MO

References

External links
Food Rite website
Naifeh's Food Rite Website
Associated Wholesale Grocers Website

Supermarkets of the United States
Companies based in Tennessee